An okta is a unit for measuring cloud cover.

Okta may also refer to:
 OKTA, a Macedonian oil company
 Okta, Inc., an American identity management company
 Okta (album), a 2020 album by the band Keiino

See also 
 Octa (disambiguation)